Jean Baffier (born in Neuvy-le-Barrois, Cher, on 18 November 1851, and died in Paris on 19 April 1920), was a French sculptor.

Biography
He became known for his bronze figurines (Le Vigneron, Le Faucheur, Le Vielleux) and his tin objects (vases, candlesticks, dinnerware) decorated with plant motifs. He also made statues and busts of historical figures (Louis XI, Jean-Paul Marat, Jean-Jacques Rousseau).

A strong regionalist, he became interested in the traditional music and folk tales of his native province of Berry. In 1886, he founded Le Réveil de la Gaule, a magazine that he edited until 1912. He was also the author of a collection of Berrichon stories, entitled Nos géants d'auterfoés.

Main works

Statues

Publications
 Le Réveil de la Gaule, ou la Justice de Jacques Bonhomme, Paris, 1886
 Les Marges d'un carnet d'ouvrier : objections sur la médaille à M. Zola offerte à propos de l'affaire Dreyfus, Paris, 1898 
 Causeries esthétiques d'un ouvrier sculpteur français. La Cathédrale de France, ses destructeurs, ses détracteurs, pourquoi on a voulu la détruire, pourquoi on l'a calomniée, Paris, 1900
 Nos géants d'auterfoés. Récits berrichons recueillis par Jean Baffier, revue of the sixteenth century, Société des études rabelaisiennes, Champion, Paris, 1913. Reedited by Champion, Paris, 1920

Bibliography
 Neil McWilliam, Monumental Intolerance. Jean Baffier, A Nationalist Sculptor in Nineteenth-Century France, Penn State University Press, 2000

References

External links
 
 

1851 births
1920 deaths
People from Cher (department)
20th-century French sculptors
20th-century French male artists
19th-century French sculptors
19th-century French male artists
French male sculptors